The 2017–18 Greek Football Cup was the 76th edition of the Greek Football Cup. A total of 33 clubs were accepted to enter. The competition commenced in September 2017 with the preliminary round and concluded on 12 May 2018 with the Final. PAOK won the competition for second consecutive year beating AEK Athens 2–0 in the final held at the Olympic Stadium.

Teams

Calendar

Participating clubs

Preliminary round
The draw for this round took place in August 2017.

Summary

|}

Matches

Aiginiakos won on away goals.

Group stage
The draw for this round took place on 11 August 2017.

Group A

Group B

Group C

Group D

Group E

Group F

Group G

Group H

Knockout phase
Each tie in the knockout phase, apart from the final, was played over two legs, with each team playing one leg at home. The team that scored more goals on aggregate over the two legs advanced to the next round. If the aggregate score was level, the away goals rule was applied, i.e. the team that scored more goals away from home over the two legs advanced. If away goals were also equal, then extra time was played. The away goals rule was again applied after extra time, i.e. if there were goals scored during extra time and the aggregate score was still level, the visiting team advanced by virtue of more away goals scored. If no goals were scored during extra time, the winners were decided by a penalty shoot-out. In the final, which were played as a single match, if the score was level at the end of normal time, extra time was played, followed by a penalty shoot-out if the score was still level.The mechanism of the draws for each round is as follows:
In the draw for the round of 16, the eight group winners are seeded, and the eight group runners-up are unseeded.The seeded teams are drawn against the unseeded teams, with the seeded teams hosting the second leg.
In the draws for the quarter-finals onwards, there are no seedings, and teams from the same group can be drawn against each other.

Bracket

Round of 16
The draw for this round took place on 4 December 2017.

Seeding

Summary

|}

Matches

Olympiacos won 4–0 aggregate.

Atromitos won 2–0 aggregate.

PAS Giannina won 4–1 aggregate.

Lamia won 4–2 aggregate.

AEK Athens won 5–0 aggregate.

PAOK won 7–2 aggregate.

Panionios won 3–0 aggregate.

AEL won 3–2 aggregate.

Quarter-finals
The draw for this round took place on 15 January 2018.

Summary

|}

Matches

PAOK won 5–1 on aggregate.

Panionios won 5–1 on aggregate.

AEK Athens won 2–1 on aggregate.

AEL won 5–3 on aggregate.

Semi-finals
The draw for this round took place on 12 February 2018.

Summary

|}

Matches

PAOK won 6–2 on aggregate.

AEK Athens won on away goals.

Final

References

External links 
 2017–18 Greek Football Cup at the Greek Football Federation site (Greek)

Greek Football Cup seasons
Cup
Greek Cup